Eulonchus marginatus is a species of small-headed flies in the family Acroceridae.

References

Further reading

 

Acroceridae
Articles created by Qbugbot
Taxa named by Carl Robert Osten-Sacken
Insects described in 1877